The Battle of Ooscota (or Ooscata) was a battle in the First British-Mysore War, a conflict between the British East India Company and Hyder Ali, the sultan of the Kingdom of Mysore. It took place on the night of the 22–23 August 1768.

Ooscota, the location of the battle, is the modern Hoskote, Bangalore Rural district, Karnataka, India.

Background
The British under Colonel Donald Campbell, and the Maratha Empire forces under Morari Rao were under march, and they encamped near Ooscata. The British contingent invited the Maratha to encamp within their defensive lines, but due to the illness of Mohammed Ali, the Nawab of Arcot, Rao declined, and they threw up their own picket a short distance away. Meanwhile, Hyder Ali was nearby and decided to attack the Maratha forces in the night.

Battle
The Mysore cavalry attacked behind Hyder Ali's war elephants, which took down the defences. Rao instructed his cavalry to remain unmounted, so that his forces could bring down any mounted troops; knowing them to be enemy. In the chaos Rao's state elephant broke loose, and wielding its chain as a weapon, threw back the cavalry in the face of the supporting infantry. Disheartened the Mysore troops retreated, with a loss of some 300 troops compared with the Maratha losses of 18.

As the British had been alerted and were advancing to relieve the Maratha, Hyder Ali decided against further attacks.

The British lost Cambell's aide de camp, Gee who had ridden to the Maratha camp to investigate, and been shot down under Rao's blanket orders to kill mounted men.

References

1768 in British India
Ooscota
Ooscota
Ooscota
Ooscota
History Bangalore Rural district